Jamie Alexander Hacking (born 30 June 1971 in Oswaldtwistle, Lancashire, England), nicknamed The Hacker, is a 3 time AMA National champion professional motorcycle racer who has spent his entire career in the United States.

Early years
At the age of 5, his father Brian gave him a small motorbike for Christmas, on which he learned the basics. At age 9 his family moved to Spartanburg, South Carolina for Brian's work. By age 12 he began competing in local motocross events and won a BMX bicycle championship. He progressed on dirt and eventually began to receive support from Kawasaki and Honda.  By 1994 he turned his attention to road racing and competed in some CCS events and later progressed on to the WERA series.

Professional career

AMA Supersport & Superbike (1997-2009)
Hacking entered the AMA Supersport Championship series in 1997 with a sponsorship with Kinko's Kawasaki and managed to qualify on the pole in Phoenix. In  he moved on to Yamaha with a full factory ride where he finished 3rd at Daytona on his debut, and won the AMA Superbike Rookie of the Year despite missing much of the year through injury. In 1999 he took two AMA Supersport wins plus several Superbike podium finishes.

In  he joined the crack Yoshimura Suzuki team, and took his first AMA Superbike race win, at Road Atlanta. In  he lost his ride with Suzuki in the Superbike class and returned to Supersport with Yamaha. This proved to be one of his best years, winning the AMA Supersport Championship with four wins and three further podiums. He narrowly failed to defend the title in 2004, also finishing as runner-up in the AMA Superstock class.  In 2006 he won both the Supersport and Superstock AMA classes. 2007 saw him move to Monster Energy Kawasaki where he would contend the Superbike and Supersport classes. He would finish the season 6th in Superbike and runner up in Supersport. In 2008, he scored six podium finishes in AMA Superbike, and briefly threatened the supremacy of Yoshimura's Ben Spies and Mat Mladin.

Moto GP (2008)
Hacking raced the works Kawasaki MotoGP bike during the US Grand Prix at Mazda Raceway Laguna Seca, deputising for an injured John Hopkins. He finished a very reasonable 11th

Superbike World Championship (2009)
Hacking also raced in the Superbike World Championship in 2009 for the Paul Bird Motorsport Kawasaki to replace injured rider Makoto Tamada. Finishing his first race in an impressive 7th place at Miller Motorsports Park. This earned Hacking the next 2 races at Misano and Donington Park although he failed to score in both.

Personal
Hacking currently resides outside of Charlotte, North Carolina. He lives there with his wife and 2 children. Hacking also owns a car performance business, JHR Performance.

Grand Prix career statistics

Races by year
(key) (Races in bold indicate pole position, races in italics indicate fastest lap)

References

External links

JamieHacking.com - Official site
2007 AMA racing results

1971 births
Living people
English motorcycle racers
British emigrants to the United States
People from Oswaldtwistle
Superbike World Championship riders
Kawasaki Motors Racing MotoGP riders
MotoGP World Championship riders